The National Democratic Party is a political party in Morocco. Its current leader is Abdellah Kadiri.

History and Profile

The party was established 1981 as a split from the National Rally of Independents.

At the last legislative elections, 27 September 2002, the party won 12  out of 325 seats. In the parliamentary election, held on 7 September 2007, the party won 14 out of 325 seats together with the Al Ahd with which it formed an alliance, called the Covenant Party.

It decided to merge into the Authenticity and Modernity Party in 2008, but then decided against this move later.

References

1981 establishments in Morocco
Political parties established in 1981
Political parties in Morocco